Dog meat is the flesh and other edible parts derived from dogs. Historically, human consumption of dog meat has been recorded in many parts of the world. During the 19th century westward movement in the United States, mountainmen, Native Americans, the U.S. Army, as well as the Confederacy during the American Civil War frequently had to sustain themselves on dogmeat; first to be consumed would be the horses, then the mules, and lastly the dogs.  In the 21st century, dog meat is consumed to a limited extent in South Korea, China, Nigeria, Switzerland, and Vietnam, and it is eaten or is legal to be eaten in other countries throughout the world. Some cultures view the consumption of dog meat as part of their traditional, ritualistic, or day-to-day cuisine, and other cultures consider consumption of dog meat a taboo, even where it had been consumed in the past. Opinions also vary drastically across different regions within different countries. It was estimated in 2014 that worldwide, 27 million dogs are eaten each year by humans.

Historical practices

Aztecs 
In the Aztec Empire, Mexican hairless dogs were bred for, among other purposes, their meat. Hernán Cortés reported when he arrived in Tenochtitlan in 1519, "small gelded dogs which they breed for eating" were among the goods sold in the city markets. These dogs, Xoloitzcuintles, were often depicted in pre-Columbian Mexican pottery. The breed was almost extinct in the 1940s, but the British military attaché in Mexico City, Norman Wright, developed a thriving breed from some of the dogs he found in remote villages. The genetic heritage of the breed has been almost erased through interbreeding with other dog breeds to keep its looks alive.

Native North Americans 
The traditional culture surrounding the consumption of dog meat varied from tribe to tribe among the original inhabitants of North America, with some tribes relishing it as a delicacy, and others (such as the Comanche) treating it as a forbidden food. Native peoples of the Great Plains, such as the Sioux and Cheyenne, consumed it, but there was a concurrent religious taboo against the meat of wild canines.

The Kickapoo people include puppy meat in many of their traditional festivals. This practice has been well documented in the Works Progress Administration "Indian Pioneer History Project for Oklahoma".

On 20 December 2018, the federal Dog and Cat Meat Trade Prohibition Act was signed into law as part of the 2018 Farm Bill. It bans slaughtering dogs and cats for food in the United States, with exceptions for Native American rituals.

Europe 
One of Ireland's mythological heroes, Cú Chulainn, had two geasa, or vows, one of which was to avoid the meat of dogs and the other was not to refuse an offer of hospitality. In the myth of his death, the breaking of this geis after being offered a meal of dog flesh removed his invulnerability, allowing him to be killed in battle the next day.

Ovid, Plutarch, Pliny and other Latin authors describe the sacrifice of puppies (catulina) to infernal deities, and for protection against grain-rust, the meat being subsequently prepared and consumed.

Polynesia 

Dogs were historically eaten in Tahiti and other islands of Polynesia, including Hawaii at the time of first European contact. James Cook, when first visiting Tahiti in 1769, recorded in his journal, "few were there of us but what allow'd that a South Sea Dog was next to an English Lamb, one thing in their favour is that they live entirely upon Vegetables". Calvin Schwabe reported in 1979 that dog was widely eaten in Hawaii and considered to be of higher quality than pork or chicken. When Hawaiians first encountered early British and American explorers, they were at a loss to explain the visitors' attitudes about dog meat. The Hawaiians raised both dogs and pigs as pets and for food. They could not understand why their British and American visitors only found the pig suitable for consumption. This practice seems to have died out, along with the native Hawaiian breed of dog, the unique Hawaiian Poi Dog, which was primarily used for this purpose.

Although Hawaii has outlawed commercial sales of dog meat, until the federal Dog and Cat Meat Trade Prohibition Act it was legal to slaughter an animal classified as a pet if it was "bred for human consumption" and done in a "humane" manner. This allowed dog meat trade to continue, mostly using stray, lost, or stolen dogs.

Religious dietary laws 
According to kashrut, Jewish dietary law, it is forbidden to consume the flesh of terrestrial mammals that do not chew their cud and have cloven hooves, which includes dogs.

In Islamic dietary laws, the consumption of the flesh of a dog, or any carnivorous animal, or any animal bearing fangs, claws, fingers or reptilian scales, is prohibited.

Dogs as survival food

Wars and famines 
In most European countries, the consumption of dog meat is taboo. Exceptions occurred in times of scarcity, such as sieges or famines.

In Germany, dog meat has been eaten in every major crisis since at least the time of Frederick the Great, and was commonly referred to as "blockade mutton".

During the Siege of Paris (1870–1871), food shortages caused by the German blockade of the city caused the citizens of Paris to turn to alternative sources for food, including dog meat. Dog meat was also reported as being sold by some butchers in Paris in 1910.

In the early 20th century, high meat prices led to widespread consumption of horse and dog meat in Germany.

In the early 20th century in the United States, dog meat was consumed during times of meat shortage.

A few meat shops sold dog meat during the German occupation of Belgium in World War I, when food was scarce.

In the latter part of World War I, dog meat was being eaten in Saxony by the poorer classes because of famine conditions.

In Germany, the consumption of dog meat continued in the 1920s. In 1937, a meat inspection law targeted against trichinella was introduced for pigs, dogs, boars, foxes, badgers, and other carnivores.

During severe meat shortages coinciding with the German occupation from 1940 to 1945, sausages found to have been made of dog meat were confiscated by Nazi authorities in the Netherlands.

Expeditions and emergencies 
Travelers sometimes have to eat their accompanying dogs to survive when stranded without other food. For example, Benedict Allen ate his dog when lost in the Brazilian rainforest. A case in Canada was reported in 2013.

Lewis and Clark 
During the Lewis and Clark expedition (1803–1806), Meriwether Lewis and the other members of the Corps of Discovery consumed dog meat, either from their own animals or supplied by Native American tribes, including the Paiutes and Wah-clel-lah Indians, a branch of the Watlatas, the Clatsop, the Teton Sioux (Lakota), the Nez Perce Indians (who did not eat dog themselves), and the Hidatsas. Lewis and the members of the expedition ate dog meat, except William Clark, who reportedly could not bring himself to eat dogs.

Polar exploration 
British explorer Ernest Shackleton and his Imperial Trans-Antarctic Expedition became trapped, and ultimately killed their sled dogs for food.

Norwegian explorer Roald Amundsen's party famously planned to eat their sled dogs, as well as to feed weaker dogs to other dogs, during their expedition to the South Pole. This allowed the party to carry less food, thus lightening the load, and ultimately helped Amundsen to win his race to the South Pole against Robert Scott's expedition, which used ponies. When comparing sled dogs to ponies as draught animals, Amundsen noted:
There is the obvious advantage that dog can be fed on dog. One can reduce one's pack little by little, slaughtering the feebler ones and feeding the chosen with them. In this way they get fresh meat. Our dogs lived on dog's flesh and pemmican the whole way, and this enabled them to do splendid work. And if we ourselves wanted a piece of fresh meat we could cut off a delicate little fillet; it tasted to us as good as the best beef. The dogs do not object at all; as long as they get their share they do not mind what part of their comrade's carcass it comes from. All that was left after one of these canine meals was the teeth of the victim – and if it had been a really hard day, these also disappeared.

Douglas Mawson and Xavier Mertz were part of the Far Eastern Party, a three-man sledging team with Lieutenant B. E. S. Ninnis, to survey King George V Land, Antarctica. On 14 December 1912 Ninnis fell through a snow-covered crevasse along with most of the party's rations, and was never seen again. Mawson and Mertz turned back immediately. They had one and a half weeks' food for themselves and nothing at all for the dogs. Their meagre provisions forced them to eat their remaining sled dogs on their  return journey. Their meat was tough, stringy and without a vestige of fat. Each animal yielded very little, and the major part was fed to the surviving dogs, which ate the meat, skin and bones until nothing remained. The men also ate the dog's brains and livers. Unfortunately eating the liver of sled dogs produces the condition hypervitaminosis A because canines have a much higher tolerance for vitamin A than humans do. Mertz suffered a quick deterioration. He developed stomach pains and became incapacitated and incoherent. On 7 January 1913, Mertz died. Mawson continued alone, eventually making it back to camp alive.

Current laws 
The slaughter, sale, purchase (including import), or consumption of dog meat is banned in some countries and legal in others, as listed in the table below and summed up in the map.

Modern practices

Africa

Cameroon 
Dogs are eaten by Vame people for certain religious rituals.

Democratic Republic of the Congo 
In 2011 it was reported that, due to high prices on other types of meat, the consumption of dog meat is common despite a longstanding taboo.

Ghana 
The Tallensi, the Akyims, the Kokis, and the Yaakuma, one of many cultures of Ghana, consider dog meat a delicacy. The Mamprusi people generally avoid dog meat, and it is eaten in a "courtship stew" provided by a king to his royal lineage. Two Tribes in Ghana, Frafra and Dagaaba are particularly known to be "tribal playmates" and consumption of dog meat is the common bond between the two tribes. Every year around September, games are organised between these two tribes and the Dog Head is the trophy at stake for the winning tribe.

It was reported in 2017 that increasing demand for dog meat (due to the belief it gives more energy) has led politician Anthony Karbo to propose dog meat factories in three northern regions of Ghana.

Nigeria 
Dogs are eaten by various groups in some states of Nigeria, including Ondo State, Akwa Ibom, Cross River, Plateau, Kalaba, Taraba and Gombe of Nigeria. They are believed to have medicinal powers. The meat is believed to improve one's sex life, provide immunity from diseases and poisoning, and offer protection from juju (charms).

In late 2014, the fear of contracting the Ebola virus disease from bushmeat led at least one major Nigerian newspaper to imply that eating dog meat was a healthy alternative. That paper documented a thriving trade in dog meat and slow sales of even well smoked bushmeat.

Asia/Pacific

Cambodia 
Animal welfare NGO Four Paws estimates that 2–3 million dogs are slaughtered annually for their meat in Cambodia. Methods of slaughtering the dog can range from strangulation, drowning, stabbing, or clubbing the head. According to a market research study in 2019 on the dog meat trade in Cambodia, overall a total of 53.6% of respondents indicated that they have eaten dog meat at some time in their lives (72.4% of males and 34.8% of females). A new campaign began in 2020 to end dog meat consumption.

Hong Kong 
In Hong Kong, the Dogs and Cats Ordinance was introduced by the British Hong Kong Government on 6 January 1950. It prohibits the slaughter of any dog or cat for use as food by fine and imprisonment. In February 1998, a Hong Konger was sentenced to one month imprisonment and a fine of two thousand HK dollars for hunting street dogs for food. Four local men were sentenced to 30 days imprisonment in December 2006 for having slaughtered two dogs.

India 
Consumption of dog meat is very rare in India, seen in a few tribal communities in some states of Northeast India, particularly Mizoram, Nagaland, Manipur, Tripura, and Arunachal Pradesh.

In March 2020, the Government of Mizoram passed the Animal Slaughter Bill 2020 which effectively bans dogs from being slaughtered in the state.

In Nagaland, dog lovers had launched a campaign to end Nagaland's dog meat trade. The Government of Nagaland banned the consumption and trading of dog meat in the state on 3 July 2020.

Indonesia 

Indonesia is predominantly Muslim, a faith which considers dog meat, along with pork, to be haram (ritually unclean). The New York Times has reported that in spite of this, dog meat consumption has been growing in popularity among Muslims and other ethnic groups in the country due to its cheap price and purported health or medicinal benefits.

Although reliable data on the dog meat trade is scarce, various welfare groups estimate that at least 1 million dogs are killed every year to be eaten. On the resort island of Bali alone, between 60,000 and 70,000 dogs are slaughtered and eaten a year, in spite of lingering concerns about the spread of rabies following an outbreak of the disease there a few years ago, according to the Bali Animal Welfare Association. Marc Ching of the Animal Hope and Wellness Foundation claimed in 2017 that the treatment of dogs in Indonesia was the "most sadistic" out of anywhere they were killed for their meat. According to Rappler and The Independent, the slaughter process for dogs in Tomohon, Sulawesi resulted in some of them being blowtorched alive.

The consumption of dog meat is often associated with the Minahasa culture of North Sulawesi, Maluku culture, Toraja culture, various ethnic from East Nusa Tenggara, and the Bataks of northern Sumatra. The code for restaurants or vendors selling dog meat is "RW", an abbreviation for rintek wuuk (Minahasan euphemism means "fine hair") or "B1" abbreviation for biang (Batak language for female dog or "bitch").

Popular Indonesian dog-meat dishes are Minahasan spicy meat dish called rica-rica. Dog meat rica-rica specifically called rica-rica "RW" which stands for Rintek Wuuk in the Minahasan language, which means "fine hair" as a euphemism referring for fine hair found in roasted dog meat. It is cooked as Patong dish by Toraja people, and as Saksang "B1" (stands for Biang which means "dog" or "bitch" in Batak dialect) by Batak people of North Sumatra. On Java, there are several dishes made from dog meat, such as sengsu (tongseng asu), sate jamu (lit. "medicinal satay"), and kambing balap (lit. "racing goat"). Asu is Javanese for "dog".

Dog consumption in Indonesia gained attention during the 2012 U.S. presidential election when incumbent Barack Obama was pointed out by his opponent to have eaten dog meat served by his Indonesian stepfather Lolo Soetoro when Obama was living in the country. Obama wrote about his experience of eating dog in his book Dreams of My Father, and at the 2012 White House Correspondents' Dinner joked about eating dog.

According to Lyn White of Animals Australia, the consumption of dog meat in Bali is not a long-held tradition. She said the meat first came from a Christian ethnic group coming to Bali, where a minority of the immigrants working in the hospitality industry have fuelled the trade.

In June 2017, an investigative report discovered that tourists in Bali are unknowingly eating dog meat sold by street vendors.

Japan 
Although the vast majority of Japanese do not eat dog meat, it has been reported that more than 100 outlets in the country have been selling it imported, mainly to Zainichi Korean customers. In 675 AD, Emperor Tenmu decreed a prohibition on its consumption during the 4th through 9th months of the year. According to Meisan Shojiki Ōrai (名産諸色往来) published in 1760, the meat of wild dog was sold along with boar, deer, fox, wolf, bear, raccoon dog, otter, weasel and cat in some regions of Edo.

Mainland China 

Estimates for total dog killings in China range from 10 to 20 million dogs annually, for purposes of human consumption. However, estimates such as these are not official and are derived from extrapolating industry reports on meat tonnage to an estimate of dogs killed.

Consuming dog meat is legal in mainland China except for the city of Shenzhen, and the Chinese Ministry of Agriculture has never issued quarantine procedures for slaughtering dogs. In 2020, the commercial slaughter and sale of dogs was banned in all of China.

It has been suggested that wolves in southern China may have been domesticated as a source of meat. Mencius (372–) talked about dog meat as being an edible, dietary meat. It was reported in the early 2000s that the meat was thought to have medicinal properties, and had been popular in northern China during the winter, as it was believed to raise body temperature after consumption and promote warmth. Historical records have shown how in times of food scarcities (as in wartime situations), dogs could also be eaten as an emergency food source.

In modern times, the extent of dog consumption in China varies by region. Generally, it is most prevalent in some of the southern provinces, especially in Canton, Guangxi, Yunnan, Sichuan, Hubei and Anhui, as well as a few of the northern provinces such as Henan, Shandong and Jilin. It was reportedly common in 2010 to find dog meat served in restaurants in Southern China, where dogs are reared on farms for consumption. In 2012, Chinese netizens and the Chinese police intercepted trucks transporting caged dogs to be slaughtered in localities such as Chongqing and Kunming.

Since 2009, Yulin, Guangxi, has held an annual festival of eating dog meat (purportedly a celebration of the summer solstice). In 2014, the municipal government published a statement distancing itself from the festival, saying it was not a cultural tradition, but rather a commercial event held by restaurants and the public. The festival in 2011 spanned 10 days, during which 15,000 dogs were consumed. Estimates of the number of dogs eaten in 2015 for the festival ranged from as high as 10,000 to lower than 1,000 amid growing pressure at home and abroad to end it. Festival organizers state that only dogs bred specifically for consumption are used, while objectors say that some of the dogs purchased for slaughter and consumption are strays or stolen pets. Some of the dogs at the festival are alleged to have been burnt or boiled alive or beaten out of the belief that increased adrenaline circulating in the dog's body adds to the flavor of the meat. Other reports, however, state that there have been little evidence of those practices since 2015.

Prior to the 2014 festival, eight dogs (and their two cages) sold for 1,150 yuan ($185) and six puppies for 1,200 yuan. Prior to the 2015 festival, a protester bought 100 dogs for 7,000 yuan ($1,100; £710). The animal rights NGO Best Volunteer Centre commented that the city had more than 100 slaughterhouses, processing between 30 and 100 dogs a day. The Yulin Centre for Animal Disease Control and Prevention states the city has only eight dog slaughterhouses selling approximately 200 dogs, and this increases to about 2,000 dogs during the Yulin festival. There have been several campaigns to stop the festival, with the first one reportedly having started among locals in China. In 2016, a petition calling for an end to the festival garnered 11 million signatures in the country. More than 3 million people have also signed petitions against it on Weibo (China's equivalent of Twitter). Prior to the 2014 festival, doctors and nurses were ordered not to eat dog meat there, and local restaurants serving dog meat were ordered to cover the word "dog" on their signs and notices. Reports in 2014 and 2016 have also suggested that the majority of Chinese on and offline disapprove of the festival.

The movement against the consumption of cat and dog meat was given added impetus by the formation of the Chinese Companion Animal Protection Network (CCAPN). Having expanded to more than 40 member societies, CCAPN began organizing protests against eating dog and cat meat in 2006, starting in Guangzhou and continuing in more than ten other cities following a positive response from the public. Before the 2008 Beijing Olympics, officials ordered dog meat to be taken off the menu at its 112 official Olympic restaurants to avoid offending visitors from various nations where the consumption of dog meat is taboo. In 2010, draft legislation was proposed to prohibit the consumption of dog meat. In 2010, the first draft proposal of it was introduced, with the rationale to protect animals from maltreatment. The legislation included a measure to jail people for up to 15 days for eating dog meat, but there were few expectations for it to be enforced.

Decline
As of the early 21st century, dog meat consumption in China is declining. In 2014, dog meat sales decreased by a third compared to 2013. It was reported that in 2015, one of the most popular restaurants in Guangzhou serving dog meat was closed after the local government tightened regulations; the restaurant had served dog meat dishes since 1963. Other restaurants that served dog and cat meat in the Yuancun and Panyu districts also stopped serving these dishes in 2015. Close to 9 million Chinese in 2016 also voted online for proposed legislation to end the consumption of dog and cat meat, but the legislation was not taken forward.

In April 2020, Shenzhen became the first Chinese city to ban consumption and production of dog and cat meat. This came as part of a wider clampdown on the wildlife trade which was thought to be linked to COVID-19 outbreak. Citing examples of Hong Kong and Taiwan, the Shenzhen city government said, "Banning the consumption of dogs and cats and other pets is a common practice in developed countries ... This ban also responds to the demand and spirit of human civilization". The city of Zhuhai followed suit in the same month with a similar ban. These decisions were applauded by animal welfare groups such as Humane Society International.

In the same month, the Chinese Ministry of Agriculture said it considers dogs as "companion animals", not as livestock.

Malaysia 
The consumption of dog meat is legal in Malaysia. The issue was brought to light in 2013 after the Malaysian Independent Animal Rescue group received a report alleging that a restaurant in Kampung Melayu, Subang had dogs caged and tortured before slaughtering them for their meat.

North Korea 
A wall painting in the Goguryeo tombs complex in South Hwangghae Province, a World Heritage Site which dates from the 4th century AD, depicts a slaughtered dog in a storehouse. The Balhae people also enjoyed dog meat, and the modern-day tradition of canine cuisine seems to have come from that era.

Daily NK reported that in early 2010, the North Korean government included dog meat in its list of one hundred fixed prices, setting a fixed price of 500 won per kilogram.

South Korea 

Gaegogi (개고기) literally means "dog meat" in Korean. The term itself is often mistaken as the term for Korean soup made from dog meat, which is actually called bosintang (보신탕; 補身湯, Body nourishing soup) (sometimes spelled "bo-shintang").

Estimates of the number of animals consumed vary widely. The Humane Society International has estimated that 2 million or possibly more than 2.5 million dogs are reared on "dog meat farms" in South Korea (though, this number includes puppy mills for the pet industry). According to the Korea Animal Rights Advocates (KARA), approximately 780,000 to 1 million dogs are consumed per year in South Korea. However, these numbers have been critiqued as not being based on actual data and having no scientific basis.

Estimates of dog meat consumption is much lower when accounting for actual sales. In 2017 the Moran Market, which occupied 30–40% of dog meat market in the nation, reported sales of about 20,000 dogs per year. Numbers have further declined from these 2017 estimates and all the major markets have shutdown, including Moran Market. According to the Ministry of Agriculture, Food and Rural Affairs, approximately 200 dog farms have been reported to be operating; though, the supply to the dog meat market is unclear as these farms also supply the pet industry.

In 2022, the Ministry for Food, Agriculture, Forestry and Fisheries of South Korea published a first official report called "Edible dog breeding and distribution survey". According to the report, as of February 2022, 521,121 dogs are reared in 1,156 dog meat farms and 388,000 dogs are consumed in 1,666 restaurants per year.

Over the past 50 years, dog meat consumption has been declining as more people have been adopting dogs as pets. In a 2020 survey, 84% of the Korean population reported never having consumed dog meat nor having plans to ever do so.

Dog meat is consumed by an estimated 3.9% of the population based on a 2018 survey. The most popular dish is the soup "boshingtang", a spicy stew meant to balance the body's heat during the summer months. Eating hot soups during the summer is thought to ensure good health by balancing one's "qi", the believed vital energy of the body. Dog meat is believed by some to increase the body temperature, to induce sweating to keep one cool during the summer (the way of dealing with heat is called heal heat with heat (이열치열, 以熱治熱, i-yeol-chi-yeol)). A 19th-century version of gaejang-guk explains the preparation of the dish by boiling dog meat with vegetables such as green onions and chili pepper powder. Variations of the dish contain chicken and bamboo shoots.

The sale of dog meat is illegal, but slaughter and consumption is legal. However, 'brutal' slaughters of any animals is prohibited by the Animal Protection Law (동물보호법), and some people were fined for slaughter of dogs by this law. The sale is disallowed because South Korean Food Sanitary Law (식품위생법) does not include dog meat as a legal food ingredient. The Ministry of Food and Drug Safety recognizes any edible product other than drugs as food. In the capital city of Seoul, the sale of dog meat was outlawed by regulation on 21 February 1984, by classifying dog meat as "repugnant food" (혐오식품, 嫌惡食品, hyeom-o sigpum), but the regulation was not rigorously enforced except during the 1988 Seoul Olympics. In 2001, the Mayor of Seoul announced there would be no extra enforcement efforts to control the sale of dog meat during the 2002 FIFA World Cup, which was partially hosted in Seoul. On 21 November 2018, the South Korean government closed the Taepyeong-dong complex in Seongnam, which served as the country's main dog slaughterhouse.

The primary dog breed raised for meat is a non-specific landrace, whose dogs are commonly named as Nureongi (누렁이) or Hwangu (황구). Nureongi are not the only type of dog currently slaughtered for their meat in South Korea. In 2015, The Korea Observer reported that many different pet breeds of dog are eaten in South Korea, including labradors, retrievers and cocker spaniels, and that the dogs slaughtered for their meat often include former pets. Some of them have reportedly been stolen from family homes. This is the saddest part for all dog lovers in Korea, because official records show they are the oldest Korean dog breed, dating back to the first century AD. 

There is some vocal group of Koreans (consisting of a number of animal welfare groups) who oppose the practice of eating dog meat. Some Koreans do not eat the meat, but feel that it is the right of others to do so. A group of activists attempted to promote and publicize the consumption of dog meat worldwide during the run-up to the 2002 FIFA World Cup, co-hosted by Japan and South Korea, which prompted retaliation from animal rights campaigners and prominent figures such as Brigitte Bardot to denounce the practice. Opponents of dog meat consumption in South Korea are critical of the eating of dog meat, as some dogs are beaten, burnt or hanged to make their meat more tender. In more recent decades, such practices are being prosecuted by law.

Amidst the decline in dog meat consumption in contemporary Korea, a vocal group in Korea has critiqued the international outcry toward dog meat consumption as being hypocritical. International animal rights activists have noted the hypocrisy, as well, given the horrific conditions under which factory farmed animals are raised in the West. Some Korean citizens, as well as members of the international community, have pointed out that the nations from which most of the outcry has emerged have the highest per capita meat consumption on the planet, several-fold higher than that of South Korea.

Philippines 

The European Society of Dog and Animal Welfare estimates that half a million dogs are slaughtered for food each year in the Philippines.

In the capital city of Manila, Metro Manila Commission Ordinance 82-05 specifically prohibits the killing and selling of dogs for food. More generally, the Philippine Animal Welfare Act 1998 prohibits the killing of any animal other than cattle, pigs, goats, sheep, poultry, rabbits, carabaos, horses, deer, and crocodiles–with exemptions for religious, cultural, research, public safety, and/or animal health reasons. Nevertheless, the consumption of dog meat is not uncommon in the Philippines, reflected in the occasional coverage in Philippine newspapers. Philippine news outlets ABS-CBN and SunStar stated in 2012 and 2017 that Korean nationals in Baguio had been playing a role in the city's dog meat trade.

According to the Animal Welfare Institute, stray dogs, with many of them having been people's pets, have been rounded up off the street for the dog meat trade and shipped to the Benguet province without food or water while steel cans are forced onto their noses and their legs are tied behind their backs. Nearly half the dogs reportedly die before reaching their final destination. They are usually then killed via clubbing or having their throats cut, after which their fur is scorched off with a blow-torch and their bodies are dismembered. According to a 2007 book co-authored by Temple Grandin, dogs and other animals in some rural Philippine areas could risk getting beaten before slaughter, out of the belief it would create better meat.

Asocena is a dish primarily consisting of dog meat originating from the Philippines. The province of Benguet specifically allows cultural use of dog meat by indigenous people and acknowledges this might lead to limited commercial use.

In the early 1980s, there was an international outcry about dog meat consumption in the Philippines after newspapers published photos of Margaret Thatcher, then British prime minister, with a dog carcass hanging beside her on a market stall. The British Government discussed withdrawing foreign aid and other countries, such as Australia, considered similar action. To avoid such action, the Filipino government banned the sale of dog meat. Dog meat was then the third most consumed meat, behind pork and goat and ahead of beef.

Singapore 
The sale of dog meat is banned in Singapore.

Taiwan 
In 2001, the Taiwanese government imposed a ban on the sale of dog meat, due to both pressure from domestic animal welfare groups and a desire to improve international perceptions, and there were some protests. In 2007, another law was passed, significantly increasing the fines to sellers of the meat. According to The Daily Meal in 2014, dog meat remained popular in Taiwan despite the laws, especially at smaller towns and villages. Animal rights activists have accused the Taiwanese government of not prosecuting those who continue to slaughter and serve dog meat at restaurants.

In April 2017, Taiwan became the first country in East Asia to officially ban the consumption of dog and cat meat as well as jail time for those who torture and kill animals. The Animal Protection Act amendments approved by the Legislative Yuan aims to punish the sale, purchase or consumption of dog or cat meat with fines ranging from NT$50,000 to NT$2 million. The amendments also stiffen punishment for those who intentionally harm animals to a maximum two years' imprisonment and fines of NT$200,000 to NT$2 million.

In October 2017, Taiwan's national legislature, known as Legislative Yuan, passed amendments to the country's Animal Protection Act which "bans the sale and consumption of dog and cat meat and of any food products that contain the meat or other parts of these animals."

Timor-Leste 

Dog meat is a delicacy popular in Timor-Leste.

Thailand 

There used to be a small regional culture of eating dog meat, as well as a trade of dogs for consumption and transporting them to nearby Vietnam where dog meat consumption was more common. In 2014, Thailand passed the Prevention of Animal Cruelty and Provision of Animal Welfare Act which, among other provisions, made it illegal to trade in or consume dog meat. As of 2016, the trade to Vietnam has continued, with CNN reporting that broken bones and crushed skulls have been a common injury for the smuggled dogs.

Uzbekistan 
Dog meat has sometimes been used in Uzbekistan in the belief that it has medicinal properties.

Vietnam 

Around five million dogs are slaughtered in Vietnam every year, making the country the second-biggest consumer of dog meat in the world after China. The consumption has been criticized by many in Vietnam and around the world as most of the dogs are pets stolen and killed in brutal ways, usually by being bludgeoned, stabbed, burned alive, or having their throat slit. Vietnam does not have strong regulations to stop the practice. Dog thieves are rarely punished, and neither are the people who buy and sell stolen meat. Dog meat is particularly popular in the urban areas of the north, and can be found in special restaurants which specifically serve dog meat.

A 2013 survey on VietNamNet, with a participation of more than 3,000 readers, showed that the majority of people, at 80%, supported eating dog meat. Up to 66 percent of the readers said that dog meat is nutritious and has been a traditional food for a very long time. Some 13% said eating dog meat is okay but dog slaughtering must be strictly controlled in order to avoid embarrassing images.

Dog meat is believed to bring good fortune in Vietnamese culture. It is seen as being comparable in consumption to chicken or pork. In urban areas, there are neighbourhoods that contain many dog meat restaurants. For example, on Nhat Tan Street, Tây Hồ District, Hanoi, many restaurants serve dog meat. Groups of customers, usually male, seated on mats, will spend their evenings sharing plates of dog meat and drinking alcohol. The consumption of dog meat can be part of a ritual usually occurring toward the end of the lunar month for reasons of astrology and luck. Restaurants which mainly exist to serve dog meat may only open for the last half of the lunar month. Dog meat is also believed to raise men's libido. There used to be a large smuggling trade from Thailand to export dogs to Vietnam for human consumption. A concerted campaign between 2007 and 2014 by animal activists in Thailand, led by the Soi Dog Foundation, convinced authorities in both Thailand and Vietnam that the dog meat trade was a hindrance to efforts to tackle rabies in Southeast Asia. In 2014, Thailand introduced a new law against animal cruelty, which greatly increased penalties faced by dog smugglers. The trade had significantly diminished.

In 2009, dog meat was found to be a main carrier of the Vibrio cholerae bacterium, which caused the summer epidemic of cholera in northern Vietnam.

Prior to 2014, more than 5 million dogs were killed for meat every year in Vietnam according to the Asia Canine Protection Alliance. There are indications that the desire to eat dog meat in Vietnam is waning. Part of the decline is thought to be due to an increased number of Vietnamese people keeping dogs as pets, as their incomes have risen in the past few decades. 

In 2018, officials in the city of Hanoi urged citizens to stop eating dog and cat meat, citing concerns about the cruel methods with which the animals are slaughtered and the diseases this practice propagates, including rabies and leptospirosis. The primary reason for this exhortation seems to be a fear that the practice of dog and cat consumption, most of which are stolen household pets, could tarnish the city's image as a “civilised and modern capital”.

Europe

Austria 
Section 6, Paragraph 2 of the law for the protection of animals prohibits the killing of dogs and cats for purposes of consumption as food or for other products.

Switzerland 
In 2012, the Swiss newspaper Tages-Anzeiger reported that dogs, as well as cats, are eaten regularly by a few farmers in rural areas. Commercial slaughter and sale of dog meat is banned, but farmers are allowed to slaughter dogs for personal consumption.

In his 1979 book Unmentionable Cuisine, Calvin Schwabe described a Swiss dog meat recipe, gedörrtes Hundefleisch, served as paper-thin slices, as well as smoked dog ham, Hundeschinken, which is prepared by salting and drying raw dog meat.

It is illegal in Switzerland to commercially produce food made from dog meat.

United Kingdom

Although the commercial trade of dog meat is illegal, it is still currently legal in the United Kingdom to consume dog meat.

France
In France, butcher shops selling dog meat were open all around the country until .

In his poem "Alcools," Guillaume Apollinaire mentions a butcher who sells dog meat.

Oceania

Australia 
Each Australian state or territory has its own regulation, but all have laws either making it illegal to eat dog meat or to kill a dog for consumption. It is also prohibited to sell dog meat based on meat processing standards and codes.

Tonga 
The consumption of domestic dog meat is commonplace in Tonga, and has also been noted in expatriate Tongan communities in New Zealand, Australia, and the United States.

Other dog products

Central Asia 
According to Eurasianet, dog fat is seen as a well-established would-be treatment for tuberculosis in parts of Central Asia. The fat has reportedly been used as a folk remedy for COVID-19 in Uzbekistan and Kyrgyzstan.

Poland 
Eating dog meat is taboo in Polish culture. However, since the 16th century, fat from various animals, including dogs, was used as part of folk medicine, and since the 18th century dog fat has had a reputation as being beneficial for the lungs. According to Polityka magazine, the main producers of dog fat in 19th- and early 20th-century Poland were Gypsies. While making lard, or smalec, out of dogs' fat is currently discouraged in the country, this practice continues in some rural areas, especially Lesser Poland.

In 2009, Polish prosecutors reportedly found that a farm near Częstochowa was overfeeding dogs to be rendered down into lard. According to Grażyna Zawada, from Gazeta Wyborcza, there were farms in Częstochowa, Kłobuck, and in the Radom area, and in the decade from 2000 to 2010 six people producing dog lard were found guilty of breaching animal welfare laws and sentenced to jail. However, the Krakow Post reported that a man who had admitted to stealing and killing dogs for lard in 2009 at Wieliczka was found not guilty of any crimes by the court, who ruled that the dogs had been slaughtered humanely for culinary purposes. As of 2014, there have been new cases prosecuted.

South Korea 

Gaesoju (개소주; 개燒酒) also known as dog wine, is a mixed drink containing dog meat and other Chinese medicine ingredients such as ginger, chestnut, and jujube to act primarily as a powerful sex drive booster for men, though it is also used to get rid of colds.

It is produced by putting a slaughtered dog into a chicken plucker to remove the fur before being placed into a pressure cooker between 6–19 hours with herbs until it is a dark liquid and bottled as a drink. Women in South Korea produce homemade gaesoju for their husbands as a bedroom gift, or they purchase commercial gaesoju from special markets.

In terms of popularity, there is a South Korean song which mentions a wife turning a dog into gaesoju for her husband and popularity of Gaesoju as a sex tonic is rising compared to dog meat sales.

Dog breeds used for meat 

The Nureongi in Korea is most often used as a livestock dog, raised for its meat, and not commonly kept as pets. In 2015, The Korea Observer reported that many different pet breeds of dog are eaten in South Korea, including Labrador retrievers and Cocker Spaniels, and that the dogs slaughtered for their meat may include former pets.

The Tosa, or Japanese Fighting Dog is replacing older breeds or mutts in South Korea. The Tosa is not commonly a pet and is banned in multiple countries; it is also very lean with a little bit of fat, making it perfect for meat production. Currently only Government-Approved dog farms in Korea raise Tosa for meat.
 
The Dabengou translated as “Big Dumb Dog” is the most used dog in dog meat farms in China. They are mutts produced by breeding St. Bernard dogs from Russia or Kazakhstan with local Chinese dogs. This produces a “beef” like texture of fat and lean, allowing the dog meat to be made into more tender dishes like burgers, sausages or steaks. They also produce larger amounts of pups, weigh over 200 pounds, grow up faster and are immune to most dog diseases. A single St. Bernard from a premium Chinese breeding farm can range from $3000–4000 since it is desired so much to produce larger mutts.

The Chow Chow was also known as “Chinese Edible-Dog” because after the Han dynasty collapsed, they were fattened and bred with Chinese breeds for meat. Today Chinese dog farms still raise Chow Chow for the purpose of eating, black skinned ones are valued due to their taste when fried while yellow are typically turned into stews.

The Xoloitzcuintli, or Mexican hairless dog, is one of several breeds of hairless dog and has been used as a historical source of food for the Aztec Empire.

The extinct Hawaiian Poi Dog and Polynesian Dog were breeds of pariah dog used by Native Hawaiians as a spiritual protector of children and as a source of food.

The extinct Tahitian Dog was a food source, and served by high ranking chiefs to the early European explorers who visited the islands. Captain James Cook and his crew developed a taste for the dog, with Cook noting, "For tame Animals they have Hogs, Fowls, and Dogs, the latter of which we learned to Eat from them, and few were there of us but what allow'd that a South Sea dog was next to an English Lamb."

See also 

 Canine butcher
 Carnism
 Cat meat
 Cow meat
 Pig meat
 Speciesism
 Seal meat
 Taboo food and drink
 Wolf meat

References

Further reading 

Barr, James, Capt. (1836). Correct And Authentic Narrative of the Florida War with a Description of MAJ. Dade's Massacre, and an Account of the Extreme Suffering, For Want of Provisions of the Army-Having Been Obliged to Eat Horses' and Dogs' Flesh, etc. New York: J. Narine, Printer, 11 Wall St.
 
  (contains some recipes)
 
Sandburg, Carl. (1970).  Abraham Lincoln, The Prairie Years and The War Years. Illustrated Edition. The Reader's Digest Association, Pleasantville, New York; The Reader's Digest Association LTD, Montreal, Canada.

External links 

 
Animal welfare
Dogs in popular culture
Cruelty to animals